Independence Peak is an  mountain summit located one mile east of the crest of the Sierra Nevada mountain range, in Inyo County of northern California. It is situated immediately south of Onion Valley on the eastern boundary of John Muir Wilderness, on land managed by Inyo National Forest. Independence Peak can be climbed via the north slope from Onion Valley. The first ascent of the summit was made in 1926 by Norman Clyde, who is credited with 130 first ascents, most of which were in the Sierra Nevada. He climbed this peak three times in 1926, and twice in 1927. He was principal of the high school in Independence from 1924 to 1928, which provided him access to this nearest peak to his home.

Climate
According to the Köppen climate classification system, Independence Peak has an alpine climate. Most weather fronts originate in the Pacific Ocean, and travel east toward the Sierra Nevada mountains. As fronts approach, they are forced upward by the peaks, causing them to drop their moisture in the form of rain or snowfall onto the range (orographic lift). Precipitation runoff from this mountain drains north into Independence Creek, thence Owens Valley.

Gallery

See also

 Kearsarge Peak
 List of mountain peaks of California

References

External links

 Weather forecast: Independence Peak
 Independence Peak Rock Climbing: Mountainproject.com

Inyo National Forest
Mountains of Inyo County, California
Mountains of the John Muir Wilderness
North American 3000 m summits
Mountains of Northern California
Sierra Nevada (United States)